

Background
University of Port Harcourt Teaching Hospital was established in April 1980 and was officially commissioned by the federal government in 1985, it is a major tertiary-care teaching and research facility in Rivers State. It is as a result of the desire of the Federal Government to provide excellent medical services, manpower training, and research in all the geopolitical zones of the country.

The mandate of the Hospital was derived from Decree 10 of 1985, University Teaching Hospitals (reconstitution of Board etc.) Decree.

 The current chief medical director is Professor Henry Arinze Anthony Ugboma.

 When it started out, there were 60 beds mainly in use. After relocating to its permanent site in 2006, the hospital's capacity was expanded to 500 beds and more.

University of Port Harcourt Teaching Hospital is managed through a three-tier managerial system consisting - the Board of Management, Hospital Management Committee (HMC) and the Departments. Nearly 200,000 patients are seen annually in both outpatient and inpatient settings, as well as over 3000 surgical operations a year. Average bed occupancy rate in 12 months has risen above 80%. Besides offering medical services, the hospital tends to provide clinical education and training to students, nurses, and other healthcare professionals. Over the years, many research activities and results from its organized units have appeared on several major national and international medical and scientific journals.

Departments

Accident and Emergency 
Accounts
Administration
Anaethesiology
Catering 
Central Sterilisation Service Department (CSSD)
Communication 
Community Medicine 
Computer Science
Dentistry
Dialysis
Ear, Nose and Throat 
General Out Patient Department 
Intensive Care Unite
Internal Medicine
Laundry
Maintenance
Medical Illustration Unit
Medical Laboratory Services (Chemical Pathology, Haematology and Blood Bank, Medical Microbiology and Parasitology, Anatomical Pathology)
Medical Records
Medical Social Welfare
Neuropsychiatry 
Nuclear Medicine 
Nurse Practice Development Unit
Obstetrics and Gynecology
Ophthalmology 
Oral Maxillo Facial
Orthopaedic Department
Paediatric Services
Pharmacy
Physiotherapy 
Radiology 
Stores
Surgical Department
Works and Services

See also

List of hospitals in Port Harcourt
List of university hospitals

References

External links 
 UPTH Official Website

Hospitals in Port Harcourt
Hospitals established in 1980
Hospital buildings completed in 1985
Port Harcourt
Hospital buildings completed in 2006
1980 establishments in Nigeria
1980s establishments in Rivers State
21st-century architecture in Nigeria
20th-century architecture in Nigeria